The 2023 Camping World SRX Series will be the third season of the Superstar Racing Experience, a stock car racing series in the United States. The six-race season will begin at Stafford Motor Speedway on July 13 and end at Lucas Oil Speedway on August 17.

Marco Andretti enters the season as the defending series champion and he will return to run full-time in the SRX in 2023 and seek a second consecutive championship.

Drivers
NOTE: Car numbers for all drivers racing in 2023 have yet to be officially announced or revealed in press releases and pictures on the SRX social media pages.

Full-time drivers

Part-time drivers

Guest drivers

Schedule
The 2023 schedule was announced on December 21, 2022. All races will be held on Thursday nights instead of Saturday nights in 2023. The season also starts in July and ends in August for the first time after previously starting in June and ending in July in both 2021 and 2022.

The 2023 SRX schedule features a return to Stafford Motor Speedway for the third straight year (making it the only track on the SRX schedule in all three years of the series) and series co-founder Tony Stewart's Eldora Speedway dirt track for the first time since 2021. The other four tracks, three of which are paved and one (Lucas Oil Speedway) of which is a dirt track, are new to the SRX.

The schedule was designed based on the NASCAR Cup Series schedule in order to attract drivers from that series to race in the SRX race on the Thursday before the weekend's Cup Series race. Each race except for the season-finale at Lucas Oil Speedway is being held at a track in the same state or area of the country as the track that the Cup Series is racing at on the weekend following the SRX race.

Broadcasting
All six races will be broadcast live on TV in the United States on ESPN and streamed on ESPN+, replacing CBS and Paramount+.

ESPN has yet to announce who they will have as commentators for the SRX. Two of the commentators for the SRX on CBS in 2021 and 2022, play-by-play Allen Bestwick and host Lindsay Czarniak, could be candidates for ESPN's SRX broadcast team as they previously worked for ESPN and served in those same roles on their IndyCar coverage, with Bestwick also having previously been on their NASCAR coverage from 2007 to 2014 (first as a pit reporter, then as a studio host and then as a play-by-play). Nicole Briscoe, Chris Fowler and Suzy Kolber, who were previously on ESPN's NASCAR broadcast team (all three as studio hosts) and still work for ESPN as commentators for other sports, could also be candidates for ESPN's SRX coverage.

See also
 2023 NASCAR Cup Series
 2023 NASCAR Xfinity Series
 2023 NASCAR Craftsman Truck Series
 2023 IndyCar Series
 2023 Indy NXT
 2023 ARCA Menards Series
 2023 ARCA Menards Series East
 2023 ARCA Menards Series West
 2023 NASCAR Pinty's Series
 2023 NASCAR Whelen Euro Series

References

External links
 

Superstar Racing Experience
SRX Series
SRX Series
SRX Series
SRX Series